was an old province of Japan  in the area of  Ibaraki Prefecture. It was sometimes called . Hitachi Province bordered on Shimōsa (Lower Fusa), Shimotsuke, and  Mutsu (Iwase -1718-, Iwashiro -1869-, Iwaki -1718- and  -1869-) Provinces. Generally, its northern border was with Mutsu.

History
The ancient provincial capital (Hitachi Kokufu) and temple (Hitachi Kokubun-ji) were located near modern Ishioka and have been excavated, while the chief shrine was further east at Kashima (Kashima Shrine). The province was established in the 7th century.

In the Sengoku period the area was divided among several daimyōs, but the chief castle was usually in the Mito Castle of the modern city of Mito.

In Edo period, one of the clans originating from Tokugawa Ieyasu, settled in the Mito Domain, known as Mito Tokugawa family or Mito Clan. Mito Domain, was a Japanese domain of the Edo period it was associated with Hitachi Province.

In Meiji era the political maps of the provinces of Japan were reformed in the 1870s, and the provinces became prefectures, and also some provinces were modified or merged, when creating the prefectures.

Historical districts
 Ibaraki Prefecture
 Ibaraki District (茨城郡) - dissolved
 Higashiibaraki District (東茨城郡)
 Nishiibaraki District (西茨城郡) - dissolved
 Kashima District (鹿島郡) - dissolved
 Kōchi District - merged with Shida District to become Inashiki District (稲敷郡) on March 29, 1896 - Kōchi dissolved
 Kuji District (久慈郡)
 Makabe District (真壁郡) - dissolved
 Naka District (那珂郡)
 Namegata District (行方郡) - dissolved
 Niihari District (新治郡) - dissolved
 Shida District (信太郡) - merged with Kōchi District to become Inashiki District on March 29, 1896 - Shida  dissolved
 Taga District (多賀郡) - dissolved
 Tsukuba District (筑波郡) - dissolved

History books about Japan
Two renowned history books about Japan were written in this province:
 Jinnō Shōtōki (Chronicles of the Authentic Lineages of the Divine Emperors), in the 14th century Kitabatake Chikafusa in the Oda Castle wrote it.
 Dai Nihonshi (Great History of Japan), in the 17th century Tokugawa Mitsukuni beginning his composition, work was continued until its completion in the Meiji era.

Notes

References
 Nussbaum, Louis-Frédéric and Käthe Roth. (2005).  Japan encyclopedia. Cambridge: Harvard University Press. ;  OCLC 58053128

External links 

  Murdoch's map of provinces, 1903

 
Former provinces of Japan